The Zwölferkogel is a mountain, in the Stubai Alps in the Austrian state of Tyrol.

Topography 
The Zwölferkogel lies about 2.7 kilometres south of the winter sport resort of Kühtai. The northwest face of the Zwölferkogel falls around 500 metres into the Längental valley. To the east below the Finstertal is the Finstertalspeicher, a reservoir belonging to the Sellrain-Silz Power Station. To the south, along a sharp arête, are the Mittagsköpfe, the  Mittagsturm tower and the Sulzkogel.

Gallery

References

External links 

Mountains of the Alps
Two-thousanders of Austria
Mountains of Tyrol (state)
Stubai Alps